The Camrose Kodiaks are a Canadian Junior "A" ice hockey team in the Alberta Junior Hockey League (AJHL).  They play in Camrose, Alberta, Canada, with home games in the EnCana Arena, which has a seating capacity for approximately 2500 people.

History
The Kodiaks were added to the Alberta Junior Hockey League (AJHL) in 1997. They missed the playoffs in their first season, but has since qualified for the playoffs in every season. The Kodiaks have won six South Division titles, five league championships, five Doyle Cups for the regional championship, three silver medals at the National Junior A Championship, and won one Canadian National Junior A Championship. Multiple players have advanced to higher levels of hockey in major junior, college, and professional leagues.

Season-by-season record
Note: GP = Games played, W = Wins, L = Losses, T/OTL = Ties/Overtime losses, SOL = Shootout losses, Pts = Points, GF = Goals for, GA = Goals against

Junior A National Championship
The National Junior A Championship, known as the Centennial Cup and formerly as the Royal Bank Cup or RBC Cup, is the postseason tournament for the Canadian national championship for Junior A hockey teams that are members of the Canadian Junior Hockey League. The tournament consists of the regional Junior A champions and a previously selected host team. Since 1990, the national championship has used a five-team tournament format when the regional qualifiers were designated as the ANAVET Cup (Western), Doyle Cup (Pacific), Dudley Hewitt Cup (Central), and Fred Page Cup (Eastern). From 2013 to 2017, the qualifiers were the Dudley Hewitt Cup (Central), Fred Page Cup (Eastern), and the Western Canada Cup champions and runners-up (Western #1 and #2).

The tournament begins with round-robin play between the five teams followed by the top four teams playing a semifinal game, with the top seed facing the fourth seed and the second facing the third. The winners of the semifinals then face each other in final game for the national championship. In some years, the losers of the semifinal games face each other for a third place game.

NHL draft picks
The following players have been drafted to the National Hockey League (NHL):
Dan Bertram — Chicago Blackhawks (2005 #54 overall)
Mike Brodeur — Chicago Blackhawks (2003 #211 overall)
Joe Colborne — Boston Bruins (2008 #16 overall)
T. J. Fast — Los Angeles Kings (2005 #60 overall)
Ben Gallacher — Florida Panthers (2010 #93 overall)
Dan Glover — New Jersey Devils (2002 #250 overall)
Sam Jardine — Chicago Blackhawks (2011 #169 overall)
Andrew MacWilliam — Toronto Maple Leafs (2008 #188 overall)
Matt McKnight — Dallas Stars (2004 #280 overall)
Dylan Olsen — Chicago Blackhawks (2009 #28 overall)
Richard Petiot — Los Angeles Kings (2001 #116 overall)
Mason Raymond — Vancouver Canucks (2005 #51 overall)
Allen York — Columbus Blue Jackets (2007 #158 overall)

NHL alumni

See also
List of ice hockey teams in Alberta

References

External links
Camrose Kodiaks website
Alberta Junior Hockey League website

1997 establishments in Alberta
Alberta Junior Hockey League teams
Ice hockey teams in Alberta
Sport in Camrose, Alberta
Ice hockey clubs established in 1997